Sun Fu ( 190s–200s), courtesy name Guoyi, was a cousin of Sun Quan, a Chinese warlord who lived during the late Eastern Han dynasty and later became the founding emperor of the state of Eastern Wu in the Three Kingdoms period.

Life
Sun Fu was the second son of Sun Qiang, the twin brother of Sun Quan's father Sun Jian. He followed Sun Ce (Sun Jian's eldest son and successor) in his later campaigns against Yuan Shu and Liu Xun, earning great merits by raiding Lingyang and Lujiang. When Liu Xun was defeated, Sun Fu was put in charge of rebuilding the city walls, which he accomplished very well. He earned the title of General Who Pacifies the South.

Before the Battle of Red Cliffs, Sun Fu decided to surrender to Cao Cao. To this end, he sent a letter to Cao, proclaiming his intent to surrender, but this letter was intercepted. Sun Quan angrily stripped Sun Fu of all rank and imprisoned him, but spared him on account of filial duty. Sun Fu was released and died a few years after the battle, never again having a military command. His sons, however, all received rank.

Family

See also
 Lists of people of the Three Kingdoms

References

 Chen, Shou (3rd century). Records of the Three Kingdoms (Sanguozhi).
 Pei, Songzhi (5th century). Annotations to Records of the Three Kingdoms (Sanguozhi zhu).

Generals under Sun Quan
Sun Ce and associates
2nd-century births
3rd-century deaths
Officials under Sun Quan
Politicians from Hangzhou
Political office-holders in Jiangxi
Han dynasty generals from Zhejiang
Han dynasty politicians from Zhejiang